The 1000 metres is an uncommon middle-distance running event in track and field competitions.

The 1000 yards, an imperial alternative, was sometimes also contested.

All-time top 25
h = hand timed
A = affected by altitude

Men
Correct as of August 2022.

Notes
Below is a list of other times equal or superior to 2:14.51:
Noah Ngeny also ran 2:12.66 (1999).
Sebastian Coe also ran 2:13.40 (1980).
Abubaker Kaki Khamis also ran 2:13.93 (2008).
Ayanleh Souleiman also ran 2:14.20 (2016).
Abdi Bile also ran 2:14.51 (1989).

Men (indoor) 
 Correct as of March 2023.

Women
Correct as of September 2021.

Notes
Below is a list of other times equal or superior to 2:31.93:
Maria Mutola also ran 2:29.66 (1996), 2:30.12 (2002), 2:30.72 (1995), 2:30.94 (1999), and 2:31.55 (1998).
Faith Kipyegon also ran 2:29.92 (2020).
Caster Semenya also ran 2:31.01 (2018).
Svetlana Masterkova also ran 2:31.18 (1999).
Olga Dvirna also ran 2:31.8h (1979).
Laura Muir also ran 2:31.93i (2017).

Women (indoor) 
 Correct as of March 2023.

Notes
Below is a list of other times equal or superior to 2:32.21:
Maria Mutola also ran 2:31.23 (1996), 2:32.08 (1996).

See also
1000 metres world record progression

References

Events in track and field
Middle-distance running